Albert Alexander Hope (2 February 1914 – 3 September 1966) was a New Zealand rower.

Hope was born in the Auckland suburb of New Lynn on 2 February 1914, the son of Ada Louisa Hope (née Gibson) and Frederick Hope.

At the 1938 British Empire Games he won the silver medal as part of the men's coxed four. He was a member of the Petone Rowing Club, and his team members in the 1938 boat were Jim Clayton (stroke), Ken Boswell, John Rigby, and George Burns (cox).

Hope died on 3 September 1966, and was buried at Hastings Cemetery.

References

1914 births
1966 deaths
Rowers from Auckland
New Zealand male rowers
Rowers at the 1938 British Empire Games
Commonwealth Games silver medallists for New Zealand
Commonwealth Games medallists in rowing
Burials at Hastings Cemetery, New Zealand
20th-century New Zealand people
Medallists at the 1938 British Empire Games